Centre for Forest-based Livelihoods and Extension (CFLE) is an Advanced Research Centre situated in Agartala in Tripura. It works under the Indian Council of Forestry Research and Education (ICFRE) of  the Ministry of Environment and Forests, Govt. of India.

See also
 Indian Council of Forestry Research and Education
 List of Environment and Forest Research Institutes in India
 Van Vigyan Kendra (VVK) Forest Science Centres

References

Indian forest research institutes
Indian Council of Forestry Research and Education
Ministry of Environment, Forest and Climate Change
Research institutes in Tripura
Year of establishment missing
Education in Agartala